Events from the year 1806 in Denmark.

Incumbents
 Monarch – Christian VII
 Prime minister – Christian Günther von Bernstorff

Events
 27 October  The Barony of Gaunø was established by Otto Reedtz-Thott (1785-1862) from the manors of Gavnø,Lindersvold and Strandegård.

Undated
 Flights in Copenhagen with manned hot air balloon.

Births
 24 February – Christopher Bagnæs Hansen, furniture maker (died 1868)
 11 October – Niels Kjærbølling, ornithological writer and lithographer, founder of Copenhagen Zoo (died 1871)
 14 October – Niels Sigfred Nebelong, historicist-style architect, resident architect for the Danish lighthouse authority (died 1871)

Deaths

References

 
1800s in Denmark
Denmark
Years of the 19th century in Denmark